The Bluff Maritime Museum is located in New Zealand's southernmost port of Bluff. The museum is situated on Foreshore Road and contains an extensive collection of Bluff's maritime heritage.

The museum was founded in November 1992, and celebrated its 20th anniversary in early 2012 and early 2013.

Being near the ancient Māori settlement of Omaui and as the oldest European settled community in New Zealand, Bluff's history illustrates the blending of two cultures and the shared community spirit, with the sea remaining as the central focus for many locals.

The museum contains a wide variety of maritime displays, artefacts, miniature models, boats, photographs and a working triple expansion engine. The biggest attraction is the full-sized oystering boat, the Monica, kindly donated by the Jones family. Visitors can climb aboard and explore the entire ship. The museum also exhibits artwork showing scenes of Bluffs early days, when it was officially known as Campbelltown.

References 

 Hall-Jones, J. 1976. Bluff Harbour. Southland Harbour Board

External links 
 Bluff Maritime Museum from Bluff promotions
 Museum website archive 
 Bluff History Group
 Listing from Museums Aotearoa

Museums in Southland, New Zealand
Maritime museums in New Zealand
Bluff, New Zealand
Organisations based in Invercargill